"The Adventure of the Devil's Foot" from 1910 is one of the 56 Sherlock Holmes short stories written by Arthur Conan Doyle. It is one of eight stories in the cycle collected as His Last Bow.

Doyle ranked "The Adventure of the Devil's Foot" ninth in his list of his twelve favorite Holmes stories.

Plot summary
Sherlock Holmes and Dr. Watson find themselves at Poldhu in Cornwall one spring for the former's health. The holiday ends when the local vicar Mr. Roundhay and his lodger Mortimer Tregennis visit Holmes, asking for his assistance. The night before, Tregennis had gone to visit his three siblings, played whist with them, and then left. The next morning, the housekeeper found the trio still sitting in their places at the table; the brothers, George and Owen, had gone insane, and the sister, Brenda, was dead. The housekeeper fainted upon entering the room; later, the doctor was summoned, returned with Tregennis, and nearly fainted himself. Tregennis went to the vicar, who took him to Sherlock Holmes. When questioned further, Tregennis says that he remembers George looking through the window, and then he himself turned, and noticed some "movement" outside. Furthermore, Tregennis was once estranged from his siblings because of a money-related quarrel; however, he insists the quarrel was made up.

Holmes goes to the house in question and, apparently carelessly, kicks over a watering pot, soaking everyone's feet. The housekeeper tells Holmes that she heard nothing in the night, and that the family had been particularly happy and prosperous lately. Holmes also observes the remains of a fire in the fireplace. Having obtained Mortimer's footprint in the watering pot incident, Holmes confirms his story about leaving immediately to fetch the vicar. However, there are no signs of any intruder; the flowerbed beneath the window, where Tregennis claimed to see something moving, is undisturbed. Holmes believes there is no supernatural influence, but admits there are no real clues to suggest how a natural being could frighten three people into insanity or death.

While Holmes is still pondering the problem, Dr. Leon Sterndale, a famous hunter-explorer and a cousin of the Tregennises, aborts his sailing from Plymouth after the vicar wires him with the tragic news. He asks Holmes what his suspicions are, and is displeased when Holmes will not voice them. After Sterndale leaves, Holmes follows him discreetly, returning later that evening.

The next morning, the vicar arrives in a panic, informing Holmes that Mortimer Tregennis has now died in the same way as his sister. The two men, along with Watson, rush to Mortimer's room, and find it foul and stuffy, even though the window has been opened; the servant who opened it is now ill. A lamp is lit, and smoking, on the table beside the dead man. Holmes finds gravel on an upstairs windowsill; he also scrapes some ashes out of the lamp and puts them in an envelope, leaving the rest for the local police to find. Holmes tells the police to contact him if they wish his help, but they never do.

Holmes deduces that a poison, activated by combustion and affecting the cognitive functions, is the murder weapon; there were fires burning in both murder rooms, and people who entered them either felt ill or fainted, further suggesting a poisoned atmosphere. He tests his hypothesis by buying a lamp like the one in Tregennis's room, lighting it, and putting some of the collected "ashes" on the smoke guard. The smoke from this powder is so potent a poison that Holmes is immediately struck down. Watson is able to resist and drags Holmes out of the room just in time.

Once recovered, Holmes explains that Mortimer Tregennis is the only one who could be guilty of the first crime. Based on footprints, the gravel on the windowsill, and other clues, Holmes further deduces that Dr. Sterndale was Mortimer's murderer. Dr. Sterndale arrives in answer to Holmes' summons, and confesses; he used the gravel to wake Mortimer, held him at gunpoint and forced him to breathe the poison. It comes from a plant called Radix pedis diaboli ("Devil’s-foot root" in Latin);  when powdered and burned, the plant is extremely toxic, causing madness or death. Sterndale once described the powder to Mortimer Treginnis, who later stole some from Sterndale's collection of African curiosities, then murdered his siblings by throwing it on the fire just before he left. Mortimer had hoped Sterndale would be at sea before news reached Plymouth, but the symptoms of the victims, described in the vicar's telegram, showed Sterndale his poison had been used. Fearing a rural jury would never believe such a fantastic story, Sterndale "executed" Mortimer himself. 

The motive for the crime lay in the fact that Sterndale was passionately in love with Brenda Tregennis; however, he had been unable to marry her, due to his first wife leaving him and the court refusing to grant him a divorce. Holmes' sympathies in this matter lie with Sterndale, and he tells him to go back to his work in Africa and never return.

Publication history

"The Adventure of the Devil's Foot" was first published in the UK in The Strand Magazine in December 1910. It was first published in the United States in the US edition of the Strand in January and February 1911. The story was published with seven illustrations by Gilbert Holiday in the Strand, and with eight illustrations in the US edition of the Strand. An extra illustration was needed for the story's publication in two parts. The story was included in the short story collection His Last Bow, which was published in the UK and the US in October 1917.

Adaptations

Film and television
"The Devil's Foot" served as the basis for a 1921 short film starring Eille Norwood as Sherlock Holmes and Hubert Willis as Dr. Watson.

It was adapted as an episode of the 1965 television series Sherlock Holmes starring Douglas Wilmer (with Nigel Stock as Dr Watson and Patrick Troughton as Mortimer Tregennis).

The story was adapted as a 1988 episode of The Return of Sherlock Holmes starring Jeremy Brett as Holmes and Edward Hardwicke as Watson.

The first episode of the HBO Asia/Hulu series Miss Sherlock has a digestible pill-bomb called the Devil's Foot.

Radio
The story was dramatised by Edith Meiser as an episode of the American radio series The Adventures of Sherlock Holmes. The episode aired on 8 October 1931, with Richard Gordon as Sherlock Holmes and Leigh Lovell as Dr. Watson. Other episodes adapted from the story aired on 17 February 1935 (with Louis Hector as Holmes and Lovell as Watson) and 30 May 1936 (with Gordon as Holmes and Harry West as Watson).

Meiser also adapted the story as an episode of the American radio series The New Adventures of Sherlock Holmes that aired on 30 October 1939. Other dramatisations of the story were broadcast on 21 May 1943 and 10 July 1944. All three productions starred Basil Rathbone as Holmes and Nigel Bruce as Watson. In an adaptation that aired on 13 January 1947, Tom Conway played Holmes with Bruce as Watson. Max Ehrlich adapted the story as an episode that aired on 31 January 1949 (with John Stanley as Holmes and Wendell Holmes as Watson).

"The Devil's Foot" was adapted for the BBC Light Programme in 1962 by Michael Hardwick, as part of the 1952–1969 radio series starring Carleton Hobbs as Holmes and Norman Shelley as Watson.

"The Devil's Foot" was dramatised for BBC Radio 4 in 1994 by Bert Coules as part of the 1989–1998 radio series starring Clive Merrison as Holmes and Michael Williams as Watson, featuring Patrick Allen as Leon Sterndale, Geoffrey Beevers as Reverend Roundhay, and Sean Arnold as Mortimer Tregennis.

In 2014, the story was adapted for radio as an episode of The Classic Adventures of Sherlock Holmes, a series on the American radio show Imagination Theatre, with John Patrick Lowrie as Holmes and Lawrence Albert as Watson.

References
Notes

Sources

External links
 

 
 

Devil's Foot, The Adventure of the
1910 short stories
Short stories adapted into films
Works originally published in The Strand Magazine